Estadio Universitario UES is a multi-use stadium in San Salvador, El Salvador.  
It is currently used mostly for football matches and is the home stadium of C.D. UES. The stadium holds 10,000 people.

References

External links
Sitio web oficial

Football venues in San Salvador
Football venues in El Salvador